The 2014–15 Oklahoma Sooners basketball team represented the University of Oklahoma in the 2014–15 NCAA Division I men's basketball season. The Sooners were led by Lon Kruger in his fourth season. The team played its home games at the Lloyd Noble Center in Norman, Oklahoma as a member of the Big 12 Conference. They finished the season 24–11, 12–6 in Big 12 play to finish in a tie for second place. They advanced to the semifinals of the Big 12 tournament where they lost to Iowa State. They received an at-large bid to the NCAA tournament where they defeated Albany in the second round and Dayton in the third round to advance to the Sweet Sixteen where they lost to Michigan State.

Previous season 
The 2013–14 Oklahoma Sooners finished the season with an overall record of 23–10, with a record of 12–6 in the Big 12 play to finish in second place. In the 2014 Big 12 tournament, the Sooners were defeated by Baylor in the quarterfinals. They received an at-large bid to the NCAA tournament where they lost in the second round to North Dakota State.

Preseason

Departures

Incoming Transfers

Recruits

Roster

Schedule

|-
! colspan=9 style="background:#960018; color:#FFFDD0;"| Exhibition

|-
! colspan=9 style="background:#960018; color:#FFFDD0;"| Non-conference Regular Season

|-
! colspan=9 style="background:#960018; color:#FFFDD0;"| Big 12 Regular Season

|-
! colspan=9 style="background:#960018; color:#FFFDD0;"| Big 12 Tournament

|-–
! colspan=9 style="background:#960018; color:#FFFDD0;"| NCAA tournament

x- Sooner Sports Television (SSTV) is aired locally on Fox Sports. However the contract allows games to air on various affiliates. Those affiliates are FSSW, FSSW+, FSOK, FSOK+, and FCS Atlantic, Central, and Pacific.

Rankings

References

Oklahoma Sooners men's basketball seasons
Oklahoma
Oklahoma